Ahmet Mete Işıkara (22 October 1941 – 21 January 2013) was a Turkish geophysicist and earthquake scientist, well known for his efforts to create public awareness of the need for protection and safety during earthquakes.

Early years
Işıkara was born 1941 in Mersin. In 1947 he went to primary school and in 1954 to junior highschool in Mersin. After finishing high school in Mersin, he studied in Istanbul University graduating in 1965. In the same year, he began his academic career as an geophysics assistant at the  Faculty of Science. He continued his studies in Imperial College London and University of Göttingen.

Ahmet Mete Işıkara married in 1969 to Aysel Ahıska, the daughter of singer Necmi Rıza Ahıska. From this marriage, son Cengiz and daughter Yeşim were born.

Career
Up to 1976 Işıkara studied on the terrestrial magnetism. Between 1976-1983 he served as the chairman of the Turkish National Geodesy and Geophysics Association and as well as the Aeronomy Commission between 1976-1983.

From 1979 to 1982, he was the coordinator of the European Workgroup for Earthquake Prediction, and in the years 1980-1983 he represented Turkey in the Earthquake Specialists Committee of the Council of Europe.

In 1985, he entered Boğaziçi University, and was appointed assistant director of Earthquake Research Center of Kandilli Observatory. In 1991, he became director of the observatory, and served at this post until 2002.

Following the 1999 İzmit earthquake, he repeatedly addressed people on television to create awareness for protection and safety during earthquakes. In this period, he earned the nickname Deprem Dede. His quote "Quakes don’t kill, buildings do." became famous.

In 2003, he was appointed chairman of the newly established Association of Preparation for Disaster and Training for Earthquake ( (AHDER)). Işıkara was last serving as the head consultant of the Turkish Red Crescent.

Politics
Işıkara tried to enter politics in the 2002 general elections, running for a seat in the parliament from the True Path Party (DYP). According to election system of Turkey, parties which fail to receive less than 10% of all votes are not qualified to gain seats in the parliament. In the 2002 elections, DYP received slightly less than 10% and Işıkara was not able to enter the parliament.

Death
Ahmet Mete Işıkara died on 21 January 2013 due to respiratory insufficiency in a hospital in Istanbul, where he was treated since 44 days in the intensive care unit. He was laid to rest at the Feriköy Cemetery, Istanbul.

Legacy
In Mersin a primary school is named after him

References

1941 births
Turkish scientists
People from Mersin
Earthquakes in Turkey
Date of birth unknown
Turkish geophysicists
Istanbul University alumni
Academic staff of Boğaziçi University
Respiratory disease deaths in Turkey
Deaths from respiratory failure
Alumni of Imperial College London
University of Göttingen alumni
2013 deaths
Burials at Feriköy Cemetery